In enzymology, a S-adenosylhomocysteine deaminase is an enzyme that catalyzes the chemical reaction

S-adenosyl-L-homocysteine + H2O  S-inosyl-L-homocysteine + NH3

Thus, the two substrates of this enzyme are S-adenosyl-L-homocysteine and H2O, whereas its two products are S-inosyl-L-homocysteine and NH3.

This enzyme belongs to the family of hydrolases, those acting on carbon-nitrogen bonds other than peptide bonds, specifically in cyclic amidines.  The systematic name of this enzyme class is S-adenosyl-L-homocysteine aminohydrolase. This enzyme is also called adenosylhomocysteine deaminase.

References

 

EC 3.5.4
Enzymes of unknown structure